In English popular culture, the "traditional" pub songs typified by the Cockney "knees up" mostly come from the classics of the music hall, along with numbers from film, the stage and other forms of popular music.

The tradition is continued in the UK by acts such as Chas & Dave  and a Tribute to Chas and Dave called Gertcha, many of whose works are in a 'pub song' format.

Typical songs include:
"Any Old Iron"
"Daddy Wouldn't Buy Me a Bow Wow"
"Knees Up Mother Brown"
"My Old Man's a Dustman"
"Nellie Dean"
"Underneath the Arches"
"Where Did You Get That Hat?"

See also

List of public house topics
Pub rock (Australia)
Pub rock (United Kingdom)

References

Folk music genres
Pubs
Drinking songs